Verne Jay Troyer (January 1, 1969 – April 21, 2018) was an American actor, comedian, YouTuber, and stunt performer. He was best known for his role of Mini-Me in the Austin Powers film series.

Early life
Verne Jay Troyer was born in Sturgis, Michigan, on January 1, 1969, the son of Susan, a factory worker, and Reuben Troyer, a repair technician. He had two siblings, Davon and Deborah. He stated that his parents "never treated me any different than my other average-sized siblings. I used to have to carry wood, feed the cows and pigs and farm animals." Troyer was initially raised Amish, but his parents left the faith when he was a child. During his childhood, Troyer spent much time visiting Amish relatives in Centreville, Michigan. He graduated in 1987 from Centreville High School, where a plaque was dedicated to him in 2003.

Career
Troyer's film career began when a former president of Little People of America contacted him, looking for someone to serve as a stunt double for the infant character "Baby Bink" in John Hughes' film Baby's Day Out (1994). He gained further work as a stunt double with some minor comedic roles in several films of the 1990s, including Dunston Checks In, Jingle All the Way (both 1996), Men in Black (1997), and My Giant (1998).

He first met with Jay Roach to discuss portraying Mini-Me in the Austin Powers series, directed by Roach and starring co-creator Mike Myers, before filming for the series' second film began. Myers was impressed with Troyer's performance, rewriting the script for Austin Powers: The Spy Who Shagged Me (1999) to give Mini-Me more screen time and remove the character's death. Troyer reprised the role three years later in Austin Powers in Goldmember (2002), and collaborated again with Myers on The Love Guru (2008).

After reaching a large audience as Mini-Me, Troyer portrayed Griphook in Harry Potter and the Sorcerer's Stone (2001), and played the role of Percy in Terry Gilliam's fantasy film The Imaginarium of Doctor Parnassus (2009). He also made several appearances as himself in reality television series, including The Surreal Life (2005), Welcome to Sweden (2007), and of the British Celebrity Big Brother 6 (2009), which he placed fouth.

Personal life
On June 25, 2008, a private home video was leaked of Troyer and his former live-in girlfriend Ranae Shrider having sex. The video, recorded in 2008 in Beverly Hills, California, and Shrider's hometown of Fort Cobb, Oklahoma, was leaked to the public by Shrider and TMZ. Kevin Blatt, the man responsible for brokering the deal for Paris Hilton's sex tape in 2003, tried to sell the video. Troyer, through his long-time attorney, Ed McPherson, sued TMZ, Blatt, and online rental company SugarDVD, for invasion of privacy and copyright infringement.

In May 2015, Troyer, his girlfriend Brittney Powell, and her son Tyson appeared on Celebrity Wife Swap, where she switched places with Hines Ward's wife.

In early April 2018, Troyer was admitted to a hospital after an incident in his home. He had previously been admitted to rehab to undergo treatment for alcoholism.

Death
Troyer died at a hospital in Los Angeles on April 21, 2018, aged 49. His death was later ruled a suicide by alcohol poisoning. He was interred in Leonidas Township, St. Joseph County, Michigan.

Filmography

Television

Music videos

Video games

Web

References

External links

Verne Troyer interview, Movieset.com

1969 births
2018 deaths
2018 suicides
20th-century American male actors
21st-century American male actors
Male actors from Michigan
Actors with dwarfism
American male film actors
American male television actors
American stunt performers
People from Centreville, Michigan
People from Sturgis, Michigan
American Amish people
Alcohol-related deaths in California
Drug-related suicides in California
YouTube channels launched in 2015
YouTube channels closed in 2018